Sharaf al-Din Qaraqush al-Armani al-Muzaffari al-Nasiri al-Taqavi (died 1212) was a Circassian Mamluk in the service of the Ayyubid prince al-Muzaffar, who engaged in a series of campaigns of conquest in Tripolitania and Ifriqiya between 1172 and the 1190s. However some historians like Ibn Khaldun and Ibn Galbun said that he was of Armenian origin. Operating on behalf of Saladin initially, but increasingly on his own account, he fought against the expanding Almohad Caliphate and allied with the Banu Ghaniya. In the end, he fell out with the Ghaniya, and was defeated and executed by Yahya ibn Ghaniya  at Waddan in 1212.

References

Sources

 
 
 

12th-century births
1212 deaths
12th-century Armenian people
13th-century Armenian people
Medieval Armenian generals
Slaves from the Ayyubid Sultanate
Saladin
Medieval Libya
12th century in Ifriqiya
Mamluks

Year of birth unknown